Curling at the 2019 Winter Universiade was held at Ivan Yarygin Sports Palace from 3 to 10 March 2019.

Medal summary

Medal table

Medalists

Men

Teams 

(source:)

Round-robin standings 
Final round-robin standings

Round-robin results 
All draw times are listed in (UTC+7).

Draw 1 
Sunday, March 3, 14:00

Draw 2 
Monday, March 4, 9:00

Draw 3 
Monday, March 4, 19:00

Draw 4 
Tuesday, March 5, 14:00

Draw 5 
Wednesday, March 5, 9:00

Draw 6 
Wednesday, March 6, 19:00

Draw 7 
Thursday, March 7, 14:00

Draw 8 
Friday, March 8, 9:00

Draw 9 
Friday, March 8, 19:00

Playoffs

Quarterfinals 
Saturday, March 9, 9:00

Semifinals 
Saturday, March 9, 16:00

Bronze Medal Game 
Sunday, March 10, 9:00

Gold Medal Game 
Sunday, March 10, 9:00

Women

Teams 

(source:)

Round-robin standings 
Final round-robin standings

Round-robin results 
All draw times are listed in (UTC+7).

Draw 1 
Sunday, March 3, 9:00

Draw 2 
Sunday, March 3, 19:00

Draw 3 
Monday, March 4, 14:00

Draw 4 
Tuesday, March 5, 9:00

Draw 5 
Tuesday, March 5, 19:00

Draw 6 
Wednesday, March 6, 14:00

Draw 7 
Thursday, March 7, 9:00

Draw 8 
Thursday, March 7, 19:00

Draw 9 
Friday, March 8, 14:00

Playoffs

Quarterfinals 
Saturday, March 9, 9:00

Semifinals 
Saturday, March 9, 16:00

Bronze Medal Game 
Sunday, March 10, 14:00

Gold Medal Game 
Sunday, March 10, 14:00

References

External links
Results at results.krsk2019.net
Results at worldcurling.org
Results Book – Curling

Curling
Winter Universiade
2019
International curling competitions hosted by Russia